Henry Green (August 23, 1818 – September 26, 1884) was British Resident of the Orange River Sovereignty, a civil servant and a diamond miner in Griqualand West.

Henry Green was born in Montreal, Quebec, Canada, the third son of William John Green and his wife Margaret Gray.

Like his father he entered the commissariat department of the British army, and he may have served in Canada before the family moved to the Cape Colony in the late 1840s. Green was in the commissariat department of the force under Captain H.D. Warden which took control of the area north of the Orange River that later became the Orange River Sovereignty.

Warden was appointed British Resident of the Orange River Sovereignty, and bought the farm Bloemfontein on which to establish the capital.

While Henry was there, three of his younger brothers joined him at various times. Charles and Fred Green used Bloemfontein as a base for their hunting expeditions around Lake Ngami, while Arthur Green, who later became a photographer, worked as a clerk in the commissariat department.

Bibliography

External links
 Green family history

South African people of British descent
South African people of Canadian descent
British colonial political officers
1818 births
1884 deaths
People from Montreal
Royal Army Service Corps officers